John Henry Dell (1830–1888) was an English landscape artist and illustrator.
He was a regular exhibitor at the British Institution and the Royal academy.

Selected works
 Cottagers 
 Feeding Time (1860)

References 

19th-century English painters
English male painters
1830 births
1888 deaths
19th-century English male artists